Alcatraz is an album by the Berkely punk rock band the Mr. T Experience, released in 1999 by Lookout! Records. It was the band's last album to include bassist Joel Reader, who left the group after its release.

Production
The album was produced by Kevin Army. It was recorded at multiple studios around the Bay Area, to ensure that the songs were sonically distinct. The album's sound differed from the band's previous two efforts, incorporating organ, keyboards, and acoustic instrumentation.

Critical reception
The Dallas Observer deemed Alcatraz "a good, old-fashioned rock album." SF Weekly wrote: "Deliberately seeking out the sonically claustrophobic atmosphere of such '80s favorites as Elvis Costello's Armed Forces and Joe Jackson's I'm the Man, the album achieves a level of nearly paranoid musicianship, rife with extemporaneous fills and exceedingly tight instrumental interplay."

Track listing

Personnel
 Dr. Frank – vocals, guitar
 Joel Reader – bass
 Jim "Jym" Pittman – drums
 Eric Noyes – hammond organ on tracks 1, 3, 8, & 10, piano on tracks 1 & 4
 Gabe Meline – hammond organ on track 13, piano on track 10, ARP on track 5
 Kevin Army – piano solo on track 4
 Paige O'Donoghue – backwards laughing on track 9
 Todd Grady – trumpet on track 2

Album information
 Produced, engineered, and mixed by Kevin Army in March and April 1999
 Recorded at Foxhound Sound Studios, Roof Brothers Studios, Sharkbite Studios, and Studio 880 in Oakland, California, and at Laughing Tiger Studios in Marin County, California
 Tracks 1-12 mixed at Foxhound Sound, track 13 mixed at Roof Brothers
 Assistant engineers: Matthew Farina, Dave Simon-Baker
 Mastered by John Golden
 Photography by Jennifer Juniper Stratford
 Art by Chris Appelgren

References

The Mr. T Experience albums
1999 albums